Purwodadi is a town and a district in Grobogan Regency, of which it is the administrative capital. It is located to the south east of Semarang, the capital of Central Java, Indonesia. It covers an area of 78.12 km2, and had a population of 139,387 at the 2020 Census. It is also well known for tauco, a soya bean sauce, and swieke, a frog legs dish.

The east side of the district is geographically a valley area between two rocky mountains, Kendeng to the south and Pegunungan Kapur Utara to the north. The mountains have teak and mahogany forests. The valley is used for agriculture and spreads from the west to the east. The area has many rivers, highways and railways.

Villages in the district include:

 Candisari
 Cingkrong
 Danyang
 Genuksuran
 Kalongan
 Kandangan
 Karanganyar
 Kedungrejo
 Kuripan
 Nambuhan
 Ngembak
 Nglobar
 Ngraji
 Pulorejo
 Purwodadi
 Putat
 Warukaranganyar

References

Grobogan Regency
Districts of Central Java
Regency seats of Central Java
Populated places in Central Java